Diego Collado's Grammar of the Japanese Language is a description of the Japanese language published in 1632, attempting to fit Japanese grammar into a Latin grammatical framework. An English translation by Richard L. Spear was published in 1975.

External links
 
Diego Collado's Grammar of the Japanese Language (English translation)

Grammar books
Grammar of the Japanese Language, Diego Collado's
Grammar of the Japanese Language, Diego Collado's
Japanese dictionaries
Late Middle Japanese texts
17th-century Latin books